Federico Mociulsky (born 15 July 1989 in Buenos Aires) is an Argentine professional association football player contracted to Deportivo Roca.

Early life 
Mociulsky's paternal grandfather, Leon, was part owner of the club in 1958. His uncle, Dr. Ernesto Mociulsky, was also a stockholder in the club during the 1980s.

Professional career 
Nicknamed "The Russian", Mociulky was promoted to the first team for training in 2007.

In 2011, he left Argentina and joined Hapoel Ashkelon in Israel on trial. Being Jewish, Mociulky would not count as a foreign player in Israel. His trial was unsuccessful at Ashkelon, so he went to Hapoel Ra'anana in hopes of securing a contract. Actually, he plays in Deportivo Roca.

References 

1989 births
Living people
Argentine Jews
Footballers from Buenos Aires
Jewish footballers
Jewish Argentine sportspeople
Argentine footballers
Association football midfielders
Club Atlético Atlanta footballers